Bridgewater is a borough in central Beaver County, Pennsylvania, United States, at the confluence of the Beaver and Ohio rivers. The population was 744 at the 2020 census. It is part of the Pittsburgh metropolitan area. The borough is best known as the home of the Bruster's Ice Cream chain. A few scenes in the 1986 movie Gung Ho were also shot in Bridgewater. Much of Bridgewater, including its two major streets, are included in the Bridgewater Historic District.

Geography

Bridgewater is located at  (40.703827, −80.296715). The borough lies at the confluence of the Ohio and Beaver rivers.

Surrounding and adjacent neighborhoods
Bridgewater has three land borders, with Beaver to the southwest, Brighton Township to the west and Fallston to the northwest.  Across the Beaver River from the east to its confluence with the Ohio River southeast, Bridgewater runs adjacent with Rochester Township, the borough of Rochester, and Monaca.

Demographics

As of the census of 2000, there were 739 people, 335 households, and 210 families residing in the borough. The population density was 1,068.5 people per square mile (413.5/km²). There were 361 housing units at an average density of 522.0 per square mile (202.0/km²). The racial makeup of the borough was 89.04% White, 8.80% African American, 0.14% Native American, 0.41% Asian, 0.27% from other races, and 1.35% from two or more races. Hispanic or Latino of any race were 0.54% of the population.

There were 335 households, out of which 22.7% had children under the age of 18 living with them, 44.5% were married couples living together, 13.4% had a female householder with no husband present, and 37.3% were non-families. 31.6% of all households were made up of individuals, and 14.9% had someone living alone who was 65 years of age or older. The average household size was 2.21 and the average family size was 2.71.

In the borough the population was spread out, with 19.6% under the age of 18, 8.0% from 18 to 24, 28.0% from 25 to 44, 26.8% from 45 to 64, and 17.6% who were 65 years of age or older. The median age was 42 years. For every 100 females, there were 90.0 males. For every 100 females age 18 and over, there were 85.6 males.

The median income for a household in the borough was $38,750, and the median income for a family was $42,500. Males had a median income of $31,023 versus $24,286 for females. The per capita income for the borough was $19,695. About 8.8% of families and 12.0% of the population were below the poverty line, including 15.4% of those under age 18 and 9.8% of those age 65 or over.

Education
Children in Bridgewater are served by the Beaver Area School District. The current schools serving Bridgewater are:
College Square Elementary School – grades K-2
Dutch Ridge Elementary School – grades 3–6
Beaver Area Middle School – grades 7–8
Beaver Area High School – grades 9–12

Media
The Beaver County Times, the sole newspaper covering Beaver County, has its headquarters in Bridgewater. A daily publication, it is the descendant of the acquisition and merger of many of the county's newspapers.

References

External links
Borough website

Populated places established in 1798
Pittsburgh metropolitan area
Boroughs in Beaver County, Pennsylvania
1798 establishments in Pennsylvania